Mel Henke (August 4, 1915 – March 31, 1979) was an American jazz pianist, Chicago bandleader, composer, arranger and jingle writer. Henke studied at the Chicago College of Music, then played with Chicago groups with Mitch Todd, Frank Snyder, Stephen Leonard and others.  Henke recorded many jazz standards with his own arrangements, including a 1946 piano solo on Bix Beiderbecke's 1928 "In a Mist". His best-known jingles included the Ajax cleanser "stronger than dirt" jingle, for Colgate-Palmolive, and "See the USA in Your Chevrolet" jingle for Chevrolet.

References

1915 births
1979 deaths
20th-century American musicians
American jazz bandleaders
American jazz pianists
Contemporary Records artists
Jazz musicians from Illinois
Jingle writers
Musicians from Chicago
RCA Victor artists
Tempo Records (US) artists
Warner Records artists